Bidens beckii, commonly called Beck's water-marigold or simply water marigold is a species of flowering plant in the family Asteraceae. It is native to Canada and the northern United States.

Description

Bidens beckii is a perennial herb sometimes as much as to 200 cm (80 inches) tall; it grows emerging from stagnant or slow-moving water, the submerged leaves are finely filiform-dissected. The stem typically arises 15 cm above the water and its leaves are simple, oppositely arranged, lanceolate to ovate and serrated and borne directly from the stem with no petiole. It produces numerous yellow flower heads containing (10-30) disc florets and (8) ray florets in late summer. The flowers are solitary at the end of the stem and 2–2.5 cm in diameter. Below the flower there are 5-8 hairless bracts which are about half as long as the petals.

References

External links

beckii
Plants described in 1821
Flora of Canada
Flora of the Northeastern United States
Flora of the Southeastern United States
Flora of the North-Central United States
Flora of the Northwestern United States